The Organ Mountains–Desert Peaks National Monument is a United States national monument in the state of New Mexico, managed by the Bureau of Land Management as part of the National Landscape Conservation System.

Description

The  monument is located in the Mesilla Valley in southern New Mexico, surrounding the city of Las Cruces in Doña Ana County. The protected area includes several mountain ranges of the Chihuahuan Desert. The five identified as being within the national monument are the Robledo Mountains, Sierra de las Uvas, Doña Ana Mountains, Organ Mountains and Potrillo Mountains. The Prehistoric Trackways National Monument is nearby. The monument protects a large variety of geological, paleontological and archaeological resources.

President Barack Obama designated the monument on May 21, 2014. Half of the monument is designated wilderness and closed to development or motorized use.

Protected areas
Organ Mountains–Desert Peaks protects many archaeological and cultural sites of interest. Before the Gadsden Purchase of 1853, this land included the border between Mexico and the United States. The Aden Lava Flow Wilderness is here and there are 243 known archaeological sites within the monument, including some of the earliest Native American settlements and petroglyphs known from three different tribes. The land also includes Shelter Cave and Conkling Cavern. Fossils of ground sloths have been found in the area.

More recently the land was used by William H. Bonney, better known as the outlaw Billy the Kid, and Geronimo, a leader during the Apache Wars, both of whom lived in various parts of New Mexico in the 19th century. It is said that Billy the Kid visited "Outlaw Rock", and there is a cave known as "Geronimo's Rock". The monument also includes  of the historic Butterfield Stagecoach Trail.

The monument includes sites where World War II bombers practiced their targeting, as well as Kilbourne Hole in the Potrillo volcanic field, where American astronauts trained for lunar missions in the 1960s.

Campaign for establishment
The area was given national monument status following a campaign by conservation advocates that lasted several years. Several bills were introduced in Congress to protect the area through legislation, but they were blocked by House Republicans. In contrast with some previous monument designations, communities and governments of Doña Ana County were supportive of the application for designation. A poll found that 60 percent of the local voters favored establishing this land as a 500,000-acre national monument.

See also
 List of national monuments of the United States

References

External links
 BLM.gov: official Organ Mountains–Desert Peaks National Monument website
BLM.gov: Organ Mountains–Desert Peaks National Monument photos album 
 Friends of Organ Mountains–Desert Peaks National Monument – public group.

 
National Monuments in New Mexico
Bureau of Land Management National Monuments
Bureau of Land Management areas in New Mexico
Protected areas of Doña Ana County, New Mexico
Units of the National Landscape Conservation System
National Monuments designated by Barack Obama
Protected areas established in 2014
2014 establishments in New Mexico
Protected areas of the Chihuahuan Desert